Bukovets is a village in Veliko Tarnovo Municipality, Veliko Tarnovo Province, Bulgaria. Bukovets's population is about 52 people.

References

Villages in Veliko Tarnovo Province